Surviving Life is a 2010 Czech comedy film by Jan Švankmajer, starring Václav Helšus, Klára Issová and Zuzana Kronerová. The film uses a mix of cutout animation from photographs and live-action segments, and tells the story of a married man who lives a double life in his dreams, where he meets another woman. It premiered out of competition at the 67th Venice International Film Festival.

Cast
 Václav Helšus as Evžen and Milan
 Klára Issová as Evženie
 Zuzana Kronerová as Milada
 Emília Došeková as super-ego
 Daniela Bakerová as Dr. Holubová
 Marcel Němec as colleague
 Jan Počepický as antiquarian
 Jana Oľhová as prostitute
 Pavel Nový as janitor
 Karel Brožek as boss
 Miroslav Vrba as Fikejz

Production
The film was co-produced by Athanor and the Slovak company C-GA Film, with participation of Česká televize and UPP. It received eight million korun from the Czech State Fund for Support and Development of Cinematography and around six million korun from Eurimages. Additional support was granted by the MEDIA Programme. The production involved a total budget of 35 million korun. Animation work was done by an international team at Švankmajer's studio in Knovíz, just outside Prague. The film uses Alexander Glazunov's Concert Waltz No.1 in D,op 47 as opening and ending theme.

Release
Surviving Life premiered on 7 September 2010 out of competition at the 67th Venice International Film Festival. It was subsequently shown at several festivals including the London Film Festival. Bontonfilm released it in the Czech Republic on 4 November 2010.

Reception
Deborah Young of The Hollywood Reporter called Švankmajer a "grand master not just of innovative animation techniques but of life itself", and wrote that the director "is at the height of his filmmaking powers as director, artistic director and storyteller here." Young also noted, however, that the film's complex narrative and unconventional imagery "will not be everyone's cup of tea." Variety'''s Leslie Felperin complimented the chemistry between Helšus and Issová, and noted how the film was more similar to Czech mainstream comedies than what normally would be expected from the director: "For all the grotesquerie on display (and there's hardly anything here as disturbing as Svankmajer's imagery in Alice from 1988), pic feels much lighter in tone than the helmer's last few films, such as Lunacy, Greedy Guts (aka Little Otik), or Conspirators of Pleasure."

Švankmajer won the Czech Lion for Best Art Direction for the film. It was also nominated for Best Director and Best Sound.

References

External links
 Surviving Life'' at Bontonfilm's website 
 

2010 films
2010 comedy films
2010 comedy horror films
Animated comedy films
Czech animated films
2010s Czech-language films
Films directed by Jan Švankmajer
Films with live action and animation
Czech comedy horror films
Works about psychoanalysis
Czech Lion Awards winners (films)
Sun in a Net Awards winners (films)
Anifilm award winners
Cultural depictions of Carl Jung
Cultural depictions of Sigmund Freud
Czech animated comedy films
Czech adult animated films